Michael Kulikowski (born September 3, 1970) is an American historian. He is Professor of History and Classics and Head of the History Department at Pennsylvania State University. Kulikowski specializes in the history of the western Mediterranean world of late antiquity. He is sometimes associated with the Toronto School of History and was a student of Walter Goffart.

Biography
Kulikowski is a son of English-born computer engineer Casimir Alexander Kulikowski, and a grandson of the Polish-born inventor Victor Kulikowski. He received his B.A. (1991) from Rutgers University, and his M.A. (1992) and Ph.D. (1998) from the University of Toronto. He also gained a Licentiate of Mediaeval Studies (canon law) from the Pontifical Institute of Mediaeval Studies in 1995. At the University of Toronto, Kulikowski was a student of Walter Goffart. Among his fellow students of Goffart were Andrew Gillett. After gaining his PhD, which was completed not with Walter Goffart, but with T. D. Barnes, Kulikowski taught at Washington and Lee University, Smith College, and the University of Tennessee. Since 2009, Kulikowski has been Professor of History and Classics and Head of the History Department at Pennsylvania State University.

Kulikowski's first book, Late Roman Spain and Its Cities, was published in 2004. He next work, Rome's Gothic Wars, was published in 2006, and is an introductory textbook on the relations between Goths and the Roman Empire in the 3rd and 4th centuries AD. In his review, Bryan Ward-Perkins described it as a "sensible, clear and uncontroversial introduction to the subject, which deserves to be included on any student reading-list" (alongside Peter Heather's "different take on the same events") which "does indeed introduce the reader to the problems of evidence, and, above all, to the essence of modern debate". 

Kulikowski is the author of numerous articles, which range from the dependability of the Notitia Dignitatum as a historical source or ethnic self-identifications to examination of the careers of various late Roman individuals and the problem of the Germanic as a historical category in Late Antiquity. He is the editor of the forthcoming Landmark Ammianus Marcellinus.

Theories

Kulikowski is sometimes seen as a member of the so-called Toronto School of History, which is associated with his former professor Walter Goffart. Kulikowski advocates purging scholarly discourse from discussion of Germanic peoples, and replacing the term "Germanic" with "barbarian".

In Rome's Gothic Wars (2006), Kulikowski denies that the history of the Goths can be reliably traced earlier than the 3rd century AD. He considers all archaeological, linguistic and literary evidence used to propose such earlier histories of the Goths to be completely dependent upon the 6th-century Getica by Jordanes, and therefore of little value. 

According to Kulikowski, the Goths were mostly of non-Gothic descent, being a population formed from a "large number of [non-Gothic] indigenes and a small number of [Gothic] migrants under the pressure of Roman imperialism, and in the shadow of the Empire". While this is a fairly common view among modern scholars, he has gone so far as to state that the Roman categorization of this large multicultural group would have influenced it to see itself as one people, named after the most important group within it, the Goths. Critics such as Ward-Perkins find this description exaggerated, because it implies the Romans manipulated the ethnic identity of their neighbours, which he believes to be impossible. 

Kulikowski believes that the history of the Goths and other "barbarians" should be "understood entirely as a response to Roman imperialism". He labels previous works on the Goths by Peter Heather, Herwig Wolfram, and Volker Bierbrauer as "extreme", "neo-romantic", "bizarre" and "outlandish", and believes they "lack theoretical rigour". Kulikowski also disagrees with Heather in the assumption that the Huns caused the fall of the Western Roman Empire, describing this idea as "simple, elegant and wrong".

Like Goffart, Kulikowski has been critical of the popular ethnogenesis theory associated the Vienna School of History, and in the English-speaking world with Patrick Geary, and to some extent Peter Heather, which proposes that a Gothic ethnicity formed several times around noble families who carried a single Gothic tradition. He considers it "a way to bring long-distance migration from the Germanic north in by the back door". On the other hand, he has written that the Viennese theory "has undoubtedly killed off essentialist views of barbarian tribal identity, an excellent result". Kulikowski charges that old German nationalist and even Nazi influences continue to influence scholarship on the Goths up to the present day, particularly through the theories of Gustav Kossinna. He considers much of what is written about Goths to be "Germanist fantasy" derived from this legacy. He writes that Heather in particular "comes perilously close to recreating the old, volkisch notion of an inherent "Germanic" belief in freedom."

Selected works
 Late Roman Spain and Its Cities, Johns Hopkins University Press, 2004
 Rome's Gothic Wars: From the Third Century to Alaric, Cambridge University Press, 2006
 The Triumph of Empire: The Roman World from Hadrian to Constantine, Harvard University Press, 2016
 The Tragedy of Empire: From Constantine to the Destruction of Roman Italy, Harvard University Press, 2019

References

Sources

External links
 
Michael Kulikowski, University of Tennessee
Michael Kulikowski, Penn State University

21st-century American historians
21st-century American male writers
University of Tennessee alumni
Rutgers University alumni
Pennsylvania State University faculty
Smith College faculty
University of Toronto alumni
Living people
1970 births
American people of Polish descent
American people of English descent
American male non-fiction writers